3 Ring Circus – Live at the Palace is a live album by American band Sublime. The tracks were recorded live at The Palace, Hollywood, California, on October 21, 1995. Lead singer and guitarist Bradley Nowell died less than seven months later on tour. According to the liner notes written by Jon Phillips (manager of Sublime from 1994 to 1996), this is the band's "first-ever, official full-length concert release".

3 Ring Circus – Live at the Palace was released as a single CD disc or a CD and two DVD set containing live video material.

Track listing
 "Great Stone" – 2:35
 "We're Only Gonna Die for Our Arrogance" – 3:22
 "Don't Push" – 2:52
 "Garden Grove" – 1:24
 "Don't Push" – 0:17
 "Right Back" – 2:45
 "New Thrash" – 1:05
 "Saw Red" – 2:03
 "Badfish" – 3:27
 "All You Need" – 3:18
 "Hope" – 2:33
 "Foolish Fool" – 3:38
 "Falling Idols" – 2:55
 "Caress Me Down" – 3:53
 "40oz. to Freedom" – 2:42
 "Ebin" – 3:47
 "54-46 Was My Number" – 2:21
 "Date Rape" – 5:06
 "House of Suffering" – 2:03
 "D.J.s" – 4:26
 "I Love My Dog" – 3:15
 "Pool Shark" – 1:56
 "Work That We Do" – 2:41
 "Greatest Hits" – 3:22
 "Smoke Two Joints" – 3:28
 "Scarlet Begonias" – 3:08
 "Ring the Alarm" – 3:02

Personnel
Sublime
Bradley Nowell – vocals, guitar
Eric Wilson – bass
Bud Gaugh – drums

References

Sublime (band) albums
2013 live albums
MCA Records live albums
Live albums published posthumously